Pyaar Diwana Hota Hai (English: Love Is Crazy) is a 2002 Indian Hindi-language romantic comedy film directed by Kirti Kumar, starring Govinda and Rani Mukerji. The film served as a remake of the Tamil film Sollamale (1998).

Synopsis 
Sunder comes from his village to the big city. He is naive, easily influenced, and illiterate. His attempts to influence girls are mocked, and he is ignored and made fun of by his roommates.

One day, he befriends an NRI, Payal Khurana, who thinks he is disabled and dumb. She feels sorry for him and decides to assist him get his voice back. She takes him to Dr. S. Puri, who is unable to find a solution. Sunder is thrilled at the attention he is getting from Payal, and decides to continue to pull wool over her eyes, for he knows that she does not love him, she only feels sorry for his handicap, and will soon be returning overseas. Little does he know that Payal is beginning to fall in love with him, and arranging for him to meet her aunt, Mrs. Chaudhary, and her mom and dad.

In the end, to keep true to his word Sunder cuts off his tongue.

Cast 
 Govinda ... Sunder
 Rani Mukerji ... Payal Khurana
 Apurva Agnihotri ... Vikram
 Deepak Tijori ... Riaz
 Laxmikant Berde 
 Om Puri ... Dr.S.Puri
 Smita Jaykar ... Mrs. Khurana
Navin Nischol... Mr. Khurana
 Johnny Lever ... Paresh Chaval (Painter)
 Farida Jalal ... Mrs. Chaudhary
 Rambha ... (Special appearance)
Vikas Sharma

Soundtrack

References

External links
 

2002 films
Hindi remakes of Tamil films
2000s Hindi-language films
Super Good Films films